Little Red Monkey, released in the United States as Case of the Red Monkey, is a 1955 British crime film directed by Ken Hughes and starring Richard Conte, Rona Anderson and Russell Napier. Detectives from Scotland Yard investigate a series of murders of leading nuclear scientists, and are intrigued by strange reports received about the crimes. The film was based on a BBC Television series of the same name, written by Eric Maschwitz and produced by Bill Lyon-Shaw, which ran for six 30-minute episodes in 1953.

The film was made by Anglo-Amalgamated at Merton Park Studios. The film was an international hit, and along with Confession proved a breakthrough for Anglo-Amalgamated. After its success the company began making more expensive productions, often hiring American stars for international appeal.

Cast

 Richard Conte - Bill Locklin
 Rona Anderson - Julia Jackson
 Russell Napier - Superintendent John Harrington
 Sylva Langova - Hilde Heller, chief spy
 Colin Gordon - Harry Martin, reporter
 Donald Bisset - Editor Harris
 John King-Kelly - Spy Henchman
 Bernard Rebel - Vinson - Spy Henchman
 Arnold Marlé - Professor Leon Dushenko
 John Horsley - Detective Sergeant Gibson
 Jane Welsh -  Superintendent McCollum
 Theodore Wilhelm - Secretary of the International Social Club
 Colin Tapley -  Sir Clive Raglan
 Noel Johnson -  Detective Sergeant Hawkins
 Jessica Kearns -  Airport Hostess
 Geoffrey Denys -  Doctor Mayhew
 Gianfranco Parolini -  Inspector May
 Guy Deghy - Social Club Recreation Director
 Peter Godsell - Tommy McCollum
 Ed Devereaux - American Sailor 
 George Margo - American Sailor
 André Mikhelson - East German Chief of Border Guards (uncredited)
 Tony Sympson - Cab Driver (uncredited)

Production
The film was based on a 1953 British television series starring Donald Houston and Honor Blackman. The show's theme tune was a hit.

Film rights were acquired by Todon Productions who had produced Duel in the Jungle not long before. Tony Owens, who ran Todon, signed Richard Conte to play the lead; Conte had recently performed in the film Mask of Dust (also known as Race for Life) in England. Principal photography began on 24 May 1954 at Elstree Studios. The film was a co production with Anglo Guild.

Reception
The Monthly Film Bulletin said it had "meagre excitements".

References

Bibliography
 Chibnall, Steve & McFarlane, Brian. The British 'B' Film. Palgrave MacMillan, 2009.

External links

Review of film at Variety
Little Red Monkey at Letterbox DVD
Little Red Monkey at BFI

1955 films
1950s spy films
British spy films
Cold War spy films
Films directed by Ken Hughes
Films set in London
Films based on television plays
1950s English-language films
1950s British films
British black-and-white films